Populus tremuloides is a deciduous tree native to cooler areas of North America, one of several species referred to by the common name aspen. It is commonly called quaking aspen, trembling aspen, American aspen, mountain or golden aspen, trembling poplar, white poplar, and popple, as well as others. The trees have tall trunks, up to 25 meters (82 feet) tall, with smooth pale bark, scarred with black. The glossy green leaves, dull beneath, become golden to yellow, rarely red, in autumn. The species often propagates through its roots to form large clonal groves originating from a shared root system. These roots are not rhizomes, as new growth develops from adventitious buds on the parent root system (the ortet).

Populus tremuloides is the most widely distributed tree in North America, being found from Canada to central Mexico. It is the defining species of the aspen parkland biome in the Prairie Provinces of Canada and extreme northwest Minnesota.

Description

The bark is relatively smooth, whitish (light green when young), and is marked by thick black horizontal scars and prominent black knots. Parallel vertical scars are tell-tale signs of elk, which strip off aspen bark with their front teeth.

The leaves are green above and gray below. Young trees and root sprouts have much larger ( long), nearly triangular leaves. (Some species of Populus have petioles flattened partially along their length, while the aspens and some other poplars have them flattened from side to side along the entire length of the petiole.)

Aspens are dioecious, with separate male and female clones. The fruit is a  pendulous string of  capsules, each capsule containing about ten minute seeds embedded in cottony fluff, which aids wind dispersal of the seeds when they are mature in early summer. Trees as young as 2–3 years old may begin seed production, but significant output begins starting at 10 years of age. Best seed production is obtained between the ages of 50 and 70 years.

Quaking aspen grows more slowly in the dry conditions of western North America than it does in the more humid east and also lives longer—ages of 80–100 years are typical, with some individuals living 200 years; the root system can live much longer. In the east, stands decay faster, sometimes in 60 years or less depending on the region.

Name
The quaking or trembling of the leaves that is referred to in the common names is due to the flexible flattened petioles. The specific epithet, tremuloides, evokes this trembling behavior and can be literally translated as "like (Populus) tremula", the European trembling aspen.

Distribution

Quaking aspen occurs across Canada in all provinces and territories, with the possible exception of regions of Nunavut north of the James Bay islands. In the United States, it can be found as far north as the northern foothills of the Brooks Range in Alaska, where road margins and gravel pads provide islands of well-drained habitat in a region where soils are often waterlogged due to underlying permafrost. It occurs at low elevations as far south as northern Nebraska and central Indiana. It grows at high altitudes as far south as Guanajuato, Mexico.

Quaking aspen grows in a wide variety of climatic conditions. The southern limit of the species' range roughly follows the  mean July isotherm.

In the sagebrush steppe, aspens occur with chokecherry, serviceberry, and hawthorn, forming a habitable haven for animal life.

Shrub-like dwarf clones exist in marginal environments too cold and dry to be hospitable to full-size trees, for example at the species' upper elevation limits in the White Mountains.

Ecology

Quaking aspen propagates itself primarily through root sprouts, and extensive clonal colonies are common. Each colony is its own clone, and all trees in the clone have identical characteristics and share a single root structure. A clone may turn color earlier or later in the fall than its neighbouring aspen clones. Fall colors are usually bright tones of yellow; in some areas, red blushes may be occasionally seen. As all trees in a given clonal colony are considered part of the same organism, one clonal colony, named Pando, is considered the heaviest and oldest living organism at six million kilograms and perhaps 80,000 years old. Aspens do produce seeds, but seldom grow from them. Pollination is inhibited by the fact that aspens are either male or female, and large stands are usually all clones of the same sex. Even if pollinated, the small seeds (three million per pound) are only viable a short time as they lack a stored food source or a protective coating.

The buds and bark supply food for snowshoe hares, moose, black bears, cottontail rabbits, porcupines, deer, grouse, and mountain beavers. The shoots are eaten by sheep, goats, and cattle. Sheep and goats also browse the foliage, as do game animals including elk. Grouse and quail especially eat the buds in winter. Mammals such as beavers and rabbits eat the bark, foliage, and buds. Beavers also store aspen logs for winter food. Other animals nest in aspen groves. The leaves of the quaking aspen and other species in the genus Populus serve as food for caterpillars of various moths and butterflies. Quaking aspen trees 

also serve as hosts to certain damaging insects such as the large aspen tortrix.

Dieback

Beginning in the 1990s, North American scientists noticed an increase in dead or dying aspen trees. As this accelerated in 2004, a debate over causes began. No insect, disease, or environmental condition has yet been definitively identified as a cause. Trees adjacent to one another are often stricken or not. In other instances, entire groves have died.

Many areas of the Western US have experienced increased diebacks which are often attributed to ungulate grazing and wildfire suppression. At high altitudes where grasses can be rare, ungulates can browse young aspen sprouts and prevent those young trees from reaching maturity. As a result, some aspen groves close to cattle or other grazing animals, such as deer or elk, have very few young trees and can be invaded by conifers, which are not typically browsed. Another possible deterrent to aspen regeneration is widespread wildfire suppression. Aspens are vigorous resprouters and even though the above-ground portion of the organism may die in a wild-fire, the roots, which are often protected from lethal temperatures during a fire, will sprout new trees soon after a fire. Disturbances such as fires seem to be a necessary ecological event in order for aspens to compete with conifers, which tend to replace aspens over long, disturbance-free intervals. The current dieback in the American West may have roots in the strict fire suppression policy in the United States. On the other hand, the widespread decimation of conifer forests by the mountain pine beetle may provide increased opportunities for aspen groves to proliferate under the right conditions.

Because of vegetative regeneration by aspen, where an entire group of trees are essentially clones, there is a concern that something that hits one will eventually kill all of the trees, presuming they share the same vulnerability. A conference was held in Utah in September 2006 to share notes and consider investigative methodology.

Uses
Aspen bark contains a substance that was extracted by indigenous North Americans and European settlers of the western U.S. as a quinine substitute.

Like other poplars, aspens make poor fuel wood, as they dry slowly, rot quickly, and do not give off much heat. Yet they are still widely used in campgrounds because they are cheap and plentiful and not widely used in building lumber. Pioneers in the North American west used them to create log cabins and dugouts, though they were not the preferred species.

Aspen wood is used for pulp products (its main application in Canada) such as books, newsprint, and fine printing paper. It is especially good for panel products such as oriented strand board and waferboard. It is light in weight and is used for furniture, boxes and crates, core stock in plywood, and wall panels.

Culture
The quaking aspen is the state tree of Utah.

See also
Pando, an exceptionally large clonal colony of P. tremuloides determined to be a single male tree

References

External links
US Forest Service Fire Effects Information System: Populus tremuloides
Alberta Forest Genetic Resources Council: Populus tremuloides
Interactive Distribution Map for Populus tremuloides
Farrar, John Laird. Trees In Canada. Fitzhenry and Whiteside, 1995
Hickman, James C., ed. The Jepson Manual: Higher Plants of California, . University of California Press, 1993.

tremuloides
Trees of North America
Taxa named by André Michaux
Plants used in traditional Native American medicine